Bing Sheng is a 2008 Chinese television series produced by Zhang Jizhong, starring Zhu Yawen, Li Tai, Hu Jing, Zhao Yi, He Zhuoyan, Xu Huanhuan, Tu Men and Wu Ma. It is loosely based on the life of the ancient Chinese militarist Sun Tzu, who wrote The Art of War. It was first broadcast on Changde TV in 2009.

Plot
During the Spring and Autumn period in ancient China, the four great clans in the Qi state compete among themselves to win a dominant position in politics. Despite the animosity between their respective fathers, Sun Wu and Guo Wujiu develop a close friendship, and they are tutored in military strategy by the renowned militarist Tian Rangju. Meanwhile, in the Chu state, Wu Zixu becomes a fugitive after his father is wrongly accused of treason and his entire family is exterminated by the incompetent King Ping of Chu. Wu Zixu settles in the Wu state with help from Sun Wu and Wujiu.

Tragically, the situation in Qi deteriorates to the point of armed conflict, when the Sun clan massacres the Guo and Gao clans overnight in a military coup. Wujiu escapes from Qi and since then he sees Sun Wu as a bitter rival and sworn enemy. Wujiu settles in the Chu state and becomes a general. On the other hand, Sun Wu is devastated by the sudden twist of events and wanders around until he finally settles in the Wu state. Through Wu Zixu, Sun Wu is introduced to King Helü of Wu, who puts him in charge of Wu's military. Sun Wu begins his illustrious career by writing The Art of War and displaying his genius in leading the Wu forces to victory in battles against rival states.

Cast

 Zhu Yawen as Sun Wu
 Li Tai as Guo Wujiu
 Hu Jing as Gao Zisu
 He Zhuoyan as Guo Moli
 Rocky Hou as Gao Jue
 Zhao Yi as Wu Zixu
 Wang Weiguo as King Liao of Wu
 Tu Men as King Helü of Wu
 Zhang Songwen as King Fuchai of Wu
 Lin Peng as Bo Pi
 Chen Jiming as En Bo
 Han Dong as Jing Chai
 Xu Huanhuan as Zhai Qian
 Zhao Bin as King Goujian of Yue
 Zhao Xiaoxiao as Fan Li
 Cao Peng as Wen Zhong
 Li Zefeng as King Zhao of Chu
 Tan Feiling as Shen Baoxu
 Wu Ma as Yan Ying
 Yang Niansheng as Sun Ping
 Jiang Hualin as Sun Shu
 Li Jichang as Yue Ping
 Wu Ting as Lady Hu

External links
  Bing Sheng official page on Sina.com

2009 Chinese television series debuts
Television series set in the Zhou dynasty
2009 Chinese television series endings
Cultural depictions of Sun Tzu
Chinese historical television series
Television series by Huayi Brothers
Television series set in the 6th century BC